Coleophora magyarica is a moth of the family Coleophoridae. It is found in Slovakia, Hungary, Ukraine, southern Russia and central Asia. It occurs in desert and semi-desert biotopes.

Adults are on wing in August.

The larvae feed on Camphorosma monspeliaca and Kochia prostrata. They feed on the generative organs (ovaries and carpels) of their host plant.

References

magyarica
Moths described in 1983
Moths of Asia
Moths of Europe